The FEI World Equestrian Games are the major international championships for equestrianism, and are administered by the Fédération Equestre Internationale (FEI). The games have been held every four years, halfway between sets of consecutive Summer Olympic Games, since 1990.  Prior to that year, all ten of the FEI's individual disciplines held separate championships, usually in separate countries. The modern WEG runs over two weeks and, like the Olympics, the location rotates to different parts of the world.   Riders and horses competing at WEG go through a rigorous selection process, and each participating country sends teams that have distinguished themselves through competition as the nation's best in each respective discipline. At the 2010 Games, 57 countries were represented by 800 people and their horses.

The WEG gradually expanded to include eight of the FEI's ten disciplines: combined driving, dressage, endurance riding, eventing, paraequestrianism, reining, show jumping, and vaulting.  The FEI's two remaining regional disciplines, horseball and tent pegging, still conduct independent championships.

The 2010 FEI World Equestrian Games in Lexington, Kentucky marked a series of firsts in WEG history: the first time WEG were held outside Europe; the first time that championships for eight FEI disciplines were held at one location (the Kentucky Horse Park); and the first time WEG had a title sponsor (in this case the animal health and nutrition group corporation Alltech, headquartered in the nearby city of Nicholasville). Permanent upgrades added to the Kentucky Horse Park leading up to the event included the completion of a 6,000 seat, climate-controlled indoor arena and completion of a 7,500 seat outdoor stadium.

The Tryon International Equestrian Center, near Mill Spring, North Carolina, was the location of the 2018 FEI World Equestrian Games.

Locations

Medal count
The current historical medal count (as of 2018) of the FEI World Equestrian Games is as follows:

Notes
Medal count is sorted by total gold medals, then total silver medals, then total bronze medals, then alphabetically. The table doesn't count events before 1990.
 The reunified Federal Republic of Germany (1990 onwards) is regarded by the FEI as being the same country as pre-reunification West Germany (1948-1990), as part of an unbroken line going back to Germany's affiliation to the FEI in 1927 during its Weimar Republic (1919-1933). If Germany and West Germany were considered to be two separate countries, their medal tallies would be: Germany 26 gold, 14 silver, and 20 bronze; West Germany 4 gold, 4 silver, and 4 bronze.
 The Soviet Union competed only in the 1990 Games, as it collapsed prior to the 1994 Games

Results
 Eventing World Championship
 Show Jumping World Championships
 Dressage World Championship

See also
Equestrian at the Summer Olympics

References

 
Dressage events
Eventing
Show jumping events
Horse driving competition
FEI-recognized competition
 
Recurring sporting events established in 1990